Robert Stormont (12 April 1872 – 5 March 1943) was a Scottish professional footballer who played as a half back or inside forward for a number of clubs in the English, Scottish and Southern leagues.

Career 
A half back or inside forward, Stormont transferred from Johnstone Wanderers to Football League First Division club Preston North End in 1893. He made just 9 league appearances in three years at Deepdale and transferred to hometown Scottish First Division club Dundee in May 1896. He made just eight appearances during the 1896–97 season, before returning to England and finding a home with Southern League First Division club Tottenham Hotspur. Over the course of four seasons at White Hart Lane, Stormont made 232 appearances in all competitions and scored 24 goals. He was a member of the 1899–1900 Southern League First Division title-winning squad and he played in the first round of the club's victorious 1900–01 FA Cup campaign. Following the 1901–02 Southern League season, which he played with First Division club Brentford, Stormont became a referee. He later made a return to playing with Maidstone United, before retiring due to injury in 1909.

Career statistics

Honours 
Tottenham Hotspur
 Southern League First Division: 1899–1900

References

1872 births
1943 deaths
Scottish footballers
English Football League players
Association football inside forwards
Preston North End F.C. players
Dundee F.C. players
Tottenham Hotspur F.C. players
Brentford F.C. players
Maidstone United F.C. (1897) players
Southern Football League players
Footballers from Dundee
Scottish Football League players
Association football wing halves